Mitchell Warren Lyons (born May 13, 1970) is a former American football tight end in the National Football League (NFL).  He attended Forest Hills Northern High School in Grand Rapids, Michigan and played college football at Michigan State University.  At 6'5" tall and 265 pounds, the Atlanta Falcons drafted him in 1993 in round 6.  He played 4 seasons with the Falcons and was then traded to the Pittsburgh Steelers, where he played 3 seasons.  His career statistics include 39 receptions for 345 yards and one touchdown.

Mitch Lyons was elected to the Michigan State University Board of Trustees for an eight-year term that began January 1, 2011.

References

1970 births
Living people
Players of American football from Grand Rapids, Michigan
American football tight ends
Michigan State Spartans football players
Atlanta Falcons players
Pittsburgh Steelers players